Benjamin Percy is an American author of novels and short stories, essayist, comic book writer, and screenwriter.

Career
Benjamin Percy has published four novels, The Dark Net, The Dead Lands, Red Moon, and The Wilding, as well as two books of short fiction: Refresh, Refresh and The Language of Elk. In 2016, he published his first book of non-fiction, a collection of essays on writing and genre fiction: Thrill Me.

Percy's first work for DC Comics was writing Detective Comics #35 - 36 in 2014, which was part of the company's New 52 branding. He eventually took over as writer on the company's Green Arrow series, beginning with issue 41, and continuing until issue 52, when that series was cancelled in preparation for DC's 2016 DC Rebirth initiative, which involved restarting its monthly titles with new #1 issues. Percy would continue as writer on Green Arrow with its new series in 2016, beginning with the one-shot Green Arrow: Rebirth, which sold over 90,000 copies when it was released in May 2016. It was the highest-selling issue with Green Arrow as the main character in recent comics history, and received a second-printing. In comparison, the final issues of the previous Green Arrow series sold between 21,000 and 22,000 copies, the last Green Arrow #1, from the New 52 launch, sold 55,512 copies, and Kevin Smith's Green Arrow #1 from 2001 sold 85,046 copies.

Bibliography

Books

Collections
 The Language of Elk (2006)
 Refresh, Refresh (2007)
 Thrill Me: Essays on Fiction (2016)
 Suicide Woods (2019)

Novels
 The Wilding (2010)
 Red Moon (2013)
 The Dead Lands (2015)
 The Dark Net (2017)
 The Ninth Metal (2021)
 The Unfamiliar Garden (2022)

Comics
AWA Studios
 Year Zero #1–5 (with Ramon Rosanas, April 2020–present)
 Devil's Highway #1–5 (with Brent Schoonover, July 2020–)

DC Comics
 Detective Comics #35–36 (October–November 2014) "Terminal" (with John Paul Leon)
 Volume 7: Anarky (hc, 176 pages, 2016) collects
  Green Arrow Volume 6 #41–52 (with Patrick Zircher, June 2015–May 2016)
 Green Arrow: Rebirth #1 (with Otto Schmidt, August 2016)
  Green Arrow Volume 7 #1-38 (with Otto Schmidt and Juan Ferreyra, August 2016–March 2018)
  Teen Titans Volume 6 #1-20 (with Jonboy Meyers, Wade Von Grawbadger, and Khoi Pham, November 2016-July 2018)
 Volume 1: Damian Knows Best (sc, 144 pages, 2017) collects
 Volume 2: The Rise of Aqualad (sc, 128 pages, 2018) collects
 Volume 3: The Return of Kid Flash (sc, 152 pages, 2018) collects
  Nightwing Volume 4 #44-50 (with Chris Mooneyham and Amancay Nahuelpan, July-December 2018)

Dynamite Entertainment
  James Bond: Black Box #1-6 (March-August 2017) (with Rapha Lobosco)
 James Bond: Black Box (hc, 176 pages, 2017) collects

Marvel Comics
 X-Force (vol. 6) #1–present (with Joshua Cassara, Stephen Segovia & Jan Bazaldua, November 2019–present)
 X-Force by Benjamin Percy: Volume 1 (collecting X-Force (vol. 6) #1–6, with Joshua Cassara & Stephen Segovia, trade paperback, 176 pages, 2020)
 X-Force by Benjamin Percy: Volume 2 (collecting X-Force (vol. 6) #7–12, with Joshua Cassara & Jan Bazaldua, trade paperback, 136 pages, 2020)
 Weapon Plus: World War IV #1 (with Georges Jeanty and Rachelle Rosenberg, January 2020)
 Wolverine (vol. 7) #1–present (with Adam Kubert & Victor Bogdonavic, February 2020–present)
 Wolverine by Benjamin Percy: Volume 1 (collecting Wolverine (vol. 7) #1–3, with Adam Kubert & Victor Bogdonavic, trade paperback, 136 pages, 2020)

 Wolverine: The Long Night Adaptation #1-5
 Marvel Comics Presents Vol. 3 #4
 Empyre: X-Men #2
 Marauders #14-15

Short fiction

Scripts
Podcasts

Wolverine: The Long Night

Wolverine: The Lost Trail

Wastelanders: Old Man Star-Lord

References

General references
 Jasper, David.  Writing Stories the Color of Oregon — Former Resident Releases Collection of Short Tales.  The Bulletin (Bend, Oregon), April 11, 2006.

Inline citations

External links 

Benjamin Percy. Whiting Awards.
Percy, Benjamin (Summer 2007). "Dial Tone". The Missouri Review. Issue 30.2
Alger, Derek (December 1, 2010). "Benjamin Percy". Pif Magazine.

American short story writers
1979 births
Living people
Writers from Eugene, Oregon
People from Deschutes County, Oregon
Southern Illinois University alumni
Brown University alumni
University of Wisconsin–Stevens Point faculty
Marquette University faculty
Iowa State University faculty
St. Olaf College faculty
American male novelists